Ludian may refer to:

Places
Ludian County (鲁甸), in Zhaotong, Yunnan, People's Republic of China (PRC)
Ludian, Henan (卢店), a town in Dengfeng, Zhengzhou, Henan, PRC

Languages
Ludian language, or Ludic, a Finnic language
Ludian, a dialect of the Tibeto-Burman Pumi language

Other 
 , a geological name for a subdivision of the Eocene epoch

See also
Luodian (disambiguation)
Lydian (disambiguation)